This is a list of VJs as well as hosts of the Filipino music channel Myx.

VJs

Current VJs
Samm Alvero

Former VJs and hosts
Danielle Mortel 
Anton Fausto 
Edward Barber 
Luis Manzano 
Robi Domingo 
Ai dela Cruz 
Sam Concepcion  (also with Universal Records)
Tippy Dos Santos 
Jairus Aquino 
Sharlene San Pedro 
Turs Daza 
Erica Abello-Daniels 
Sally Acupan 
Mike Advincula 
Karla Aguas 
K.A. Antonio 
Clara Balaguer 
Rico Blanco  (now an actor & formerly from Rivermaya Band)
Carlos "Calde" Calderon
Tutti Caringal (now currently on his rock band 6cyclemind & also formerly from Protein Shake)
Sarah Carlos 
Kaz Castillo 
Sam Concepcion  (now a singer, actor and tv host)
Kim Cruz 
Luigi D'Avola 
Ton Vergel de Dios 
Lourd de Veyra 
Alex Diaz 
John Eastwood 
Geoff Eigenmann  (now an actor on FPJs Ang Probinsyano)
Heart Evangelista 
Ed Feist 
Andrei Felix 
Aya Fernandez  (now an actress & also recently part of FPJs Ang Probinsyano)
Mica Froilan 
Ylona Garcia  (now based in Los Angeles California)
Nikki Gil 
Nel Gomez 
Igi Guerrero 
Paul Hammond
Angel Jones
Sunny Kim 
Gianna Llanes  (formerly a basketball Courtside Reporter of MPBL)
Vieo Lopez 
Diego Loyzaga  (now an actor)
Chino Lui Pio  (younger brother of Hale vocalist guitar player Champ Lui Pio)
Franco Mabanta-Marcos 
Raimund Marasigan 
Michael Mariano 
Karel Marquez  (now an actress)
Michelle Ng 
Robin Nievera  (son of singer comedian TV host Martin Nievera & Pops Fernandez)
Bernard Palanca  (nephew of TV host & actor & Former Pinoy Wrestling Commentator Johnny Revilla & grandson of actor Amado Goyena & also brother of actor Mico Palanca)
Jett Pangan  (now currently performing with The Dawn Band)
Donny Pangilinan 
Ala Paredes 
Iñigo Pascual  (son of actor TV host former That's Entertainment member Piolo PJ Pascual)
Joyce Pring 
Janine Ramirez 
Francis "Brew" Reyes 
Kaye Reyes 
K-La Rivera 
Bianca Roque 
Jon Salkin
Anthony Saludares
Mark San Diego
Julz Savard 
Sanya Smith 
JC Tevez 
Debbie Then 
Nathan Ursua
Michi Valeriano 
Iya Villania 
Monica Yncierto

References

External links
 www.myxph.com

Myx